Magrath is a town in Cardston County, Alberta, Canada. Its population was 2,481 in 2021.

History 

Magrath was established in 1899 by settlers sent by the Church of Jesus Christ of Latter-day Saints (LDS Church) from Utah and Idaho. These Church of Jesus Christ of Latter-day Saints settlers were recruited by the Alberta Railway and Irrigation Company to construct irrigation works in the area funded by British interests by the family of Sir Alexander Galt. The settlers were paid in cash and land in the town. This was the first major irrigation work in Canada and was made possible by the settlers' experience with the extensive irrigation projects undertaken by their church in Utah and Idaho.

The irrigation system was completed in November 1899 and spanned ninety-miles. It was the first large-scale irrigation system in Canada. The area's irrigation canal system supplies water to farmers throughout Southern Alberta and was the first major irrigation project in Canada. In its early years Magrath was known as The Irrigation Capital of Canada, and later as "The Garden City" for its beautiful natural setting and plentiful trees. The design and layout of Magrath was based on the Church of Jesus Christ of Latter-day Saints 'Plat of Zion' urban design model. Magrath also has historical links to the internationally recognized British Garden City tradition which was piloted in England during this same period.

Magrath was named after Charles Alexander Magrath, the son-in-law of Sir Alexander Galt. Magrath post office was established 1 March 1900, with Ammon Mercer as first postmaster.

Demographics 

In the 2016 Census of Population conducted by Statistics Canada, the Town of Magrath recorded a population of 2,374 living in 757 of its 794 total private dwellings, a  change from its 2011 population of 2,217.

Religious affiliation 
The following is a breakdown of Magrath's population by religious affiliation from the 2001 federal census.

 Protestant: 84%
 Catholic: 4%
 No religious affiliation: 11%
 Christian Orthodox: <1%
 Christian (unspecified denomination): <1%

Statistics Canada includes 44 churches in its 2001 Protestant definition, including members of the Church of Jesus Christ of Latter-day Saints and the Community of Christ.

The religious affiliation within Magrath is primarily from the LDS Church. There is a stake based in Magrath, which is composed of ten congregations (eight wards and two branches) in the town and surrounding area. As of June 2016, the total membership in the Magrath Alberta Stake was reported as 2433 members.

Attractions 
 Buffalo Bin Elevator - Magrath, the first of five ever built in the Province. The "Buffalo Bin" style grain elevator was built as an experiential elevator for Alberta Wheat Pool in the 1970-1980s, today only three of the original buffalo bins remain. The others still standing are Foremost and Fort Saskatchewan.
 Galt Irrigation Canal,  first major irrigation project in Canada, a National Historic Site of Canada.
 Galt Canal Nature Trail
 Magrath Golf club
 Magrath Skateboard Park
 Magrath Wind farm

Notable people 
 Randall K. Bennett, general authority of the LDS Church.
 Phil Tollestrup (b. 1949), Olympics basketball player and member of the Canadian Basketball Hall of Fame
Gordon McOmber (1919-2018), Lieutenant Governor for Montana (1988-1989) was born in Magrath.
Taylor Cook (b.1999), Power forward for the MacEwan University Griffins men’s basketball team  Famed archery hunter, harvested 2 deer during the Magrath deer Influx of 2023.

See also 
List of communities in Alberta
List of towns in Alberta

References

External links 

1901 establishments in the Northwest Territories
Cardston County
Latter-day Saint settlements in Canada
Populated places established in 1899
Towns in Alberta